Thermutopsis is a genus of lichenized fungus within the family Lichinaceae. This is a monotypic genus, containing the single species Thermutopsis jamesii.

References

External links
Index Fungorum

Lichinomycetes
Lichen genera
Monotypic Ascomycota genera